Japan's Imperial Conspiracy is a nonfiction historical work by David Bergamini. Its subject is the role of Japanese elites in promoting Japanese imperialism and the Greater East Asia Co-Prosperity Sphere; in particular, it examines the role of Crown Prince and Emperor Hirohito in the execution of Japan's Imperial conquest, and his role in postwar Japanese society.

According to Charles David Sheldon, this book:
is a polemic which, to our knowledge, contradicts all previous scholarly work.... Specialists on Japan have unanimously demolished Bergamini's thesis and his pretensions to careful scholarship.

According to historian Richard Storry, "A check of Mr. Bergamini's references reveals the flimsy, gossamer-thin basis of his argument." He concludes, "The material that is presented does not supply a foundation on which to build a theory of imperial conspiracy."

Alvin Coox reviewing the book in the American Historical Review states:
 Most upsetting is the selective, misleading use of sources to buttress a tortured thesis wherein accidents are inconceivable, honest  mistakes improbable. The object is to incriminate the emperor personally in every crime and aggression.

The book concludes that the conventional conclusion of historical analyses – that the Imperial household was largely powerless and not culpable or particularly supportive of the imperial adventures, blame for which is assigned to military elites – is mistaken. Instead, it asserts that the internal political fighting necessary to gain support for imperialism was a long-premeditated plan supported by all sectors of the elite and especially by members of the imperial family.

The reason given as to why the American occupiers allowed the continuation of the institution of the Emperor is that its support was sought for the purposes of fighting Communism and the nearby Soviet Russia. Bergamini draws his conclusion from a variety of sources but gives prominence to his interpretation of various diaries kept by involved figures.

Social Troubles Institute

The Social Troubles Institute, Social Troubles Research Center or
simply Colonization Academy, which Bergamini alleged was founded in 1921, was a think tank dedicated  to future conquest plans on the Asian mainland, and their political implications. It had the patronage of Crown Prince Hirohito and was set up on land that had once been the Imperial Meteorological Observatory.

Bergamini describes the Institute as a secret indoctrination center (protected by extensive security measures) for select younger sons, of politicians, Japanese nobility and militarist supporters, who desired to participate in fulfilling the dreams of Imperial conquest harbored among elements of Japan's aristocracy.  The first draft of Japanese conquest plans for world domination were traced by Bergamini to the institute.

According to Bergamini's theory, graduates of this ultrasecret 'political' think tank, recruited only by special invitation from rightwing circles, continued its 'political' and 'military' practice in the occupation zones in  Manchuria.  From this 'school' began the political and strategic debate between the Strike North Group (the Army group, pro-war against Soviet Siberia) and the Strike South Group (the Navy group concerned with the Chinese lands and especially Southeast Asia).

The Director and principal academic adviser was Shūmei Ōkawa, with Mitsuru Toyama another 'professor' in the center.  Both were adherents to the Black Dragon Society.  This center was closed in 1945 by the Allied authorities.

References

 "From Our Correspondent: Hirohito and the War A conversation with biographer Herbert Bix" By Todd Crowell November 30, 2000 Web posted at 8:00 p.m. Hong Kong time, 7:00 a.m. EST
 "Imperial Conspiracy in Japan?" (in Review Articles). By Richard Storry. Pacific Affairs, Vol. 45, No. 2. (Summer, 1972), pp. 272–276.
 "Japan's Imperial Conspiracy, David Bergamini"; book review by Alvin D. Coox. The American Historical Review, Vol. 77, No. 4. (Oct., 1972), pp. 1169–1170.
 "Palace and Politics in Prewar Japan, by David Anson Titus", book review by Chalmers Johnson. The American Political Science Review, Vol. 71, No. 2. (Jun., 1977), pp. 802–803.
 "Palace and Politics in Prewar Japan, by David Anson Titus". Book review by Nathaniel B. Thayer. Political Science Quarterly, Vol. 90, No. 3. (Autumn, 1975), pp. 600–602.
 "Pearl Harbor Without Rancor: A German View; Pearl Harbor, 7. Dezember 1941: Der Ausbruch des Krieges Zwischen Japan und den Vereinigten Staaten und die Ausweitung des Europaischen Krieges zum Zweiten Weltkrieg. By Peter Herde". Book review by Hans L. Trefousse. Reviews in American History, Vol. 9, No. 4. (Dec., 1981), .

Bibliography

 
 
 
 
 
 
 
 
 

1971 non-fiction books
Books about Japan
Hirohito
Shōwa period